Nostalgia is the sixth studio album by Scottish singer-songwriter Annie Lennox. It was released on 30 September 2014 by Island Records. It is Lennox's first album in four years, and her third album of covers. The album consists entirely of cover versions, mainly of compositions from the Great American Songbook originally written in the 1930s; two compositions initially date from the 1950s. The material was researched and learned by Lennox as she studied archival footage uploaded to YouTube.

Nostalgia debuted at number nine on the UK Albums Chart, becoming Lennox's sixth UK top-10 solo album. It has since been certified Gold by the BPI for sales in excess of 100,000 copies in the UK. It debuted at number 10 on the US Billboard 200 with first-week sales of 32,000 copies, earning Lennox her third top-10 solo album on the chart, as well as her first-ever number-one album on both Billboards Jazz Albums and Traditional Jazz Albums charts. It had sold 139,000 copies in the United States as of April 2015. Nostalgia peaked inside the top ten in Austria, Canada, Italy and Switzerland. The album was nominated for Best Traditional Pop Vocal Album at the 57th Grammy Awards.

Background and release
On 15 August 2014, Lennox published a blog post on her official website announcing the upcoming release of Nostalgia. She stated that the album would initially be released on vinyl LP format on 30 September 2014 as a three-week vinyl exclusive. Nostalgia was previewed to a small audience at the Hollywood Forever Cemetery in Los Angeles on 12 August 2014.

Promotion
Lennox explained that she did not plan to tour as extensively as she did in support of her album Songs of Mass Destruction (2007). She told Billboard that "at this point in time, less is more for me. I'm more about quality than quantity, and I think this is quite a niche place to be."

The single "I Put a Spell on You" received its first radio play on 15 September 2014 by Ken Bruce on BBC Radio 2. Lennox performed the song at the 57th Annual Grammy Awards in 2015, and coupled with the inclusion of the track as the opening song of the film Fifty Shades of Grey, pushed it into the Billboard Hot 100 at number 97 in February 2015. It also entered the UK Singles Chart at number 63 that same month. Despite a relatively lowly chart peak, in October 2022 the single was certified Silver by the BPI denoting sales/equivalent streams of 200,000 copies in the UK, making it one of Lennox's most popular singles.

Critical response

Nostalgia received generally favourable reviews from critics. At Metacritic, the album has a score of 68 out of 100 based on eight reviews.

Mojo gave the album a positive review, stating it was "Straight and true, without a trace of rear-view-mirror sentimentality." Mike Wass of Idolator wrote that Lennox "breathes new life into the much-covered gems with perhaps the best vocal performance of her long and varied career", noting the assistance given by the "haunting arrangements". He stated that it would be an understatement to call the album "a departure from Annie's usual oeuvre," and that Lennox "puts her own inimitable spin" on the tracks. In a mixed review, The Guardian stated "Lennox can't hope to approach the anguish or disgust of Billie Holiday's original 'Strange Fruit', so why even try, unless you're going to totally reinvent the song like the Cocteau Twins did? Lennox is at her best when she sounds most involved, and her beautiful takes on 'Georgia on My Mind', 'God Bless the Child' and 'You Belong to Me' are full of poignancy and yearning."

Track listing

Personnel
Credits for Nostalgia adapted from Tidal.

Musicians
 Annie Lennox - all vocals, Fender Rhodes piano, flute, organ, percussion, piano, string arrangement
 Mike Stevens - production, accordion, guitar, harmonica, keyboards, organ, vibraphone
 Chris Hill - bass guitar, double bass
 Ivan Hussey - cello
 Neal Wilkinson - drums
 Nichol Thomposn - trombone
 Simon Finch - trumpet
 Stephen Hussey - viola, violin, orchestration
 Richard Brook - percussion

Technical
 Mike Stevens - production, engineering, mixing, programming, studio personnel
 Mandy Parnell - master engineering, studio personnel
 Cameron Craig - studio personnel

Artwork
 Gavin Taylor - art direction, design
 Robert Sebree - photography

Charts

Weekly charts

Year-end charts

Certifications

Release history

References

2014 albums
Annie Lennox albums
Blue Note Records albums
Covers albums
Island Records albums
Traditional pop albums